Nina's House is a 2005 French war film directed by Richard Dembo.

Plot
In the final months of the Holocaust, Nina struggles to integrate 25 children liberated from Nazi concentration camps with the other orphans in her care in the east of France.

Cast 
 Agnès Jaoui as Nina
 Sarah Adler as Marlène
  as Eva
  as Avner
  as Arié
 Adèle Csech as Sylvie
  as Georges
 Vincent Rottiers as Gabriel
 Bernard Blancan as Emile
 Gaspard Ulliel as Izik

References

External links 
 

2005 films
2000s war films
French war films
Holocaust films
2000s French films